The memorial to gay and lesbian victims of National Socialism (also known as the FEZ memorial) is a monument in Cologne, Germany, dedicated to the gay and lesbian victims of the Nazis.

The memorial, dedicated on 24 June 1995, is located next to the Hohenzollern Bridge, on the bank of the Rhine. The site was chosen for its historical significance: Traditionally, the bridge was a popular meeting place for gay men who wanted to have anonymous sexual contacts.

History 
The study group "Dykes and Queers", led by Jörg Lenk, proposed the memorial in March 1990. The official applicant was the Federation of German Trade Unions' Cologne chapter, backed publicly by various individuals and organizations. 

The Cologne Office for Cultural Affairs proposed 25 possible artists in 1993. Eleven design proposals were submitted, and an independent jury decided unanimously in 1994 in favour of Achim Zinkann, a sculptor from Rostock who had taught art and history at the University of Siegen. The project was funded by 30,900 marks (€15,798) in donations. The opening ceremony took place on 24 June 1995, coinciding both with Cologne's gay pride celebration and with the 50th anniversary of the liberation of Germany from Nazi rule.

Similar monuments exist in Frankfurt (the Frankfurt Angel memorial, opened 11 December 1994) and in Berlin (opened 27 May 2008). Plaques and panels have also been installed at the sites of the Mauthausen, Neuengamme, Dachau, and Sachsenhausen concentration camps.

Design 
The memorial consists of pink and grey granite. It is 120 cm (~47 inches) high and  69 cm (~27 inches) wide. Its shape is similar to the pink triangle used by the Nazis to identify gay men in concentration camps.

The text on the memorial reads "Killed — Silenced: The gay and lesbian victims of National Socialism".

See also 
 
 List of LGBT monuments and memorials
 List of people executed for homosexuality in Europe
 List of LGBT rights activists
 Cologne Pride

Literature 
 Limpricht/Müller/Oxenius. Verführte Männer — Das Leben der Kölner Homosexuellen im Dritten Reich, Köln 1991
 Centrum Schwule Geschichte Köln. «Das sind Volksfeinde» — Die Verfolgung von Homosexuellen an Rhein und Ruhr 1933-45, Köln 1998
 Jürgen Müller. Ausgrenzung der Homosexuellen aus der «Volksgemeinschaft» — Die Verfolgung von Homosexuellen in Köln 1933—1945, Köln 2003
 Claudia Schoppmann. Verbotene Verhältnisse — Frauenliebe 1938—1945, Berlin 1999
 Burkhard Jellonnek, Rüdiger Lautmann. Nationalsozialistischer Terror gegen Homosexuelle — Verdrängt und ungesühnt, Paderborn 2002
 Pierre Seel. Ich, Pierre Seel, deportiert und vergessen, Köln 1996
 Stümke-Winkler. Rosa Winkel, Rosa Listen, Hamburg 1981
 Frank Sparing. «Wegen Vergehen nach § 175 verhaftet» — Die Verfolgung der Düsseldorfer Homosexuellen, Düsseldorf 1997

References

External links 

 Rosa-Winkel-Mahnmal
 Centrum Schwule Geschichte
 Frankfurter-Engel
 Mahnmal-Berlin

Buildings and structures in Cologne
LGBT monuments and memorials in Europe
Persecution of homosexuals in Nazi Germany
Monuments and memorials to the victims of Nazism
Tourist attractions in Cologne